Sipilä is a Finnish surname. Notable people with the surname include:

Juha Sipilä (born 1961), Finnish politician
Elis Sipilä (1887–1958), Finnish gymnast
Helvi Sipilä (1915–2009), Finnish diplomat
Jukka Sipilä (1936–2004), Finnish actor and director
Markus Sipilä (born 1980), Finnish curler
Tapio Sipilä (born 1958), Finnish wrestler
Tauno Sipilä (1921–2001), Finnish cross-country skier
Ulla Sipilä, Finnish ice hockey referee
Väinö Sipilä (1897–1987), Finnish long-distance runner
Wilho Sipilä (1858–1917), Finnish politician

Finnish-language surnames